is the concept album by Yen Town Band, fictional music group from the 1996 motion picture Swallowtail directed by Shunji Iwai. The album was actually recorded by a Japanese singer-songwriter Chara who played the starring role in the film. It was released by the Sony Music Entertainment Japan in September 1996.

Background
Yen Town Band is the name of the band featured in the film. Glico, the character Chara plays, is the main vocalist of the band, made up of residents from the Shanghai section of the Yentown slum. The concept album was a collaboration between Chara and the producer Takeshi Kobayashi. Kobayashi elaborated a Beatlesque sound on the whole album.

Reception
The theme song for the movie, "", was released in July 1996, two months prior to the film's release. It was a slow hit, selling over 70,000 copies between July and August. In September, when major promotion for the film began, the single finally broke the top 20 (at #18).

The album was released simultaneously with the film in mid September. It debuted at number-one the Oricon charts for 2 weeks (selling 227,400 and 127,290 units in each respective week), becoming the performer's first chart-topping hit. The album eventually spent 18 weeks on the top 100, with cumulative sales of 785,000 units just in Japan.

"Mama's Alright" was featured as a B-side of the "Swallowtail Butterfly (Ai no Uta)" single, and the track "" was featured in Sprite commercials that starred Chara herself. The closing track My Way is a standard cover of the English version originally recorded by Frank Sinatra.

Track listing
All songs arranged and produced by Takeshi Kobayashi

Singles

Charts

Weekly charts

Year-end charts

Certifications

References

Chara (singer) albums
Albums produced by Takeshi Kobayashi
1996 albums